The 1995–96 Gamma Ethniki was the 13th season since the official establishment of the third tier of Greek football in 1983. Panetolikos and Niki Volos were crowned champions in Southern and Northern Group respectively, thus winning promotion to Beta Ethniki. Pyrgos and Panserraikos also won promotion as a runners-up of the groups.

Fostiras, Chaidari, Pannafpliakos, Chalkida, Chania, Charavgiakos, Apollon Krya Vrysi, Pontioi Veria, Kozani, Eordaikos, Velissario and Fokikos were relegated to Delta Ethniki.

Southern Group

League table

Northern Group

League table

References

Third level Greek football league seasons
3
Greece